Hori Naoteru may refer to:

Hori Naoteru (d. 1669) (1631-1669), 3rd daimyō of Suzaka Domain
Hori Naoteru (d.1813) (1755-1813), 9th daimyō of Suzaka Domain

See also
Hori clan